The Governor of Dnipropetrovsk Oblast is the head of executive branch for the Dnipropetrovsk Oblast.

The office of Governor is an appointed position, with officeholders being appointed by the President of Ukraine, on recommendation from the Prime Minister of Ukraine, to serve a four-year term.

The official residence for the Governor is located in Dnipro.

Governors

Representative of the President
 Pavlo Lazarenko (1992–1994)

Heads of the Administration
 Pavlo Lazarenko (1995)
 Mykola Derkach (1995–1997)
 Viktor Zabara (1997–1998)
 Oleksandr Migdeyev (1998–1999)
 Mykola Shvets (1999–2003)
 Volodymyr Yatsuba (2003–2004)
 Volodymyr Meleshchyk (2004–2005) (acting)
 Serhii Kasyanov (2005)
 Ivan Chornokur (2005) (acting)
 Yuriy Yekhanurov (2005)
 Nadiia Deyeva (2005–2007)
 Viktor Bondar (2007–2010)
 Semen Krol (2010) (acting)
 Viktor Sergeyev (2010) (acting)
 Oleksandr Vilkul (2010–2012)
 Dmytro Kolesnikov (2012–2014)
 Ihor Kolomoyskyi (2014–2015)
 Valentyn Reznichenko (2015–2019)
 Dmytro Batura (2019) (acting)
 Oleksandr Bondarenko (2019–2020)
 Valentyn Reznichenko (2020–2023)
 Volodymyr Orlov (2023) (acting)
 Serhiy Lysak (2023–present)

Notes

References

Sources
 World Statesmen.org

External links
Government of Dnipropetrovsk Oblast in Ukrainian

 
Dnipropetrovsk Oblast